"First Day Out" may refer to:

"First Day Out" (Tee Grizzley song)
"First Day Out" (Kodak Black song)